The Royal Mail models H-2 (1914–15) and H-2½ (1916), the Amesbury Special model H-3 (1915) and the Baby Grand model H-4 (1914–16) were American cars made by Chevrolet. It was replaced by the Chevrolet Series F in 1917.

Beginning 

The Baby Grand was one of the first automobiles made by Chevrolet under W.C. Durant, GM's founder. It was part of his idea to build a car to compete with the very popular and affordable Ford Model T. When it first came out, it was priced at US$875 ($ in  dollars ) as a four-door, 5-passenger touring car (a 1914 Model T touring was US$500 ($ in  dollars )). A speedometer was standard.  One advantage over a Model T Ford was that a Baby Grand could get an electric starter (the Model T did not get them until 1919).

Models
In 1914 the Series H debuted with the H-2 Royal Mail Roadster and the H-4 5-seater Baby Grand Touring model, both with a  wheelbase.

In 1915, all Series H models got a longer  wheelbase and larger brakes, and an electric starter was now standard.

Also for 1915 Chevrolet introduced the Amesbury Special model H-3, a 3-seat roadster (similar to the Royal Mail) that sold for $985. It came painted in French grey with green patent leather interior. The standard wheels were the plain wooden spoke type, but most of the cars sold had the optional Houk wire wheels which cost $125 extra and were painted green to match the interior. Sadly due to poor sales this model was dropped after only one year.

In 1916, the Royal Mail model H-2½ was introduced which was the first integral trunk for Chevrolet with gas tank in the rear between the frame rails.

The Series H models were moved upmarket when the $490 Chevrolet 490 was introduced in June 1915 to compete directly with the Ford Model T.

Total Chevrolet production for 1913 was 5,987.

References 

Series H